3C 223 is a Seyfert galaxy with a quasar-like appearance located in the constellation Leo Minor.

References

External links
 www.jb.man.ac.uk/atlas/ (J. P. Leahy)

223
Radio galaxies
Seyfert galaxies
3C 223
Leo Minor